Only in the Morning is an EP by the American rock band Breather Resist. The album was released on March 25, 2003 through Deathwish Inc.

Track listing 
 "Just Do It" – 2:40
 "The Pity Party" – 3:19
 "Died to Be Famous" – 1:20
 "The Best Mistake" – 1:38
 "Pretty Like Cancer" – 2:14
 "Cruciform Casket" – 1:59
 "It Stops One" – 2:36
 "It Stops Two" – 6:22

References

2003 EPs
Deathwish Inc. EPs